Clark Boyd (born June 14, 1978) is a Republican member of the Tennessee House of Representatives, representing District 46 since January 11, 2018.

Background and education 
Boyd was born June 14, 1978 in his hometown of Lebanon, Tennessee. He has been married to his wife Jada for 17 years and has two kids, Wilson and Blair Ellen, and they are all members of Immanuel Baptist Church in Lebanon. He went to East Tennessee State University and has a Bachelor of Science degree in Human Development and Learning with a Minor in Military Science. Alongside being very active in his church, serving as a deacon and a Sunday School teacher for newly married couples, Boyd is the owner of a State Farm Insurance agency in Lebanon. Boyd was also a former Captain of the US Army Reserve with 11 years of service in the US Army and Army National Guard.

Community involvement
As is listed out on his page in the Tennessee General Assembly, Boyd is involved with the following activities:  House member of the 110th and 111th General Assemblies, Former President of the Rotary Club of Lebanon, Lebanon/Wilson County Chamber of Commerce, Former President of the Wilson County Habitat For Humanity, Living Sent Ministries Board Member, National Association of Insurance and Financial Advisors, Deacon and Sunday School Teacher at Immanuel Baptist Church, the National Rifle Association, Leadership Wilson, and is a former Captain of the US Army Reserve, having 11 years of service in the US Army and the Army National Guard.

Career 
His career started in 2014, where he ran against Mae Beavers in the Republican primary for Tennessee's 17th Senate district, losing with 40.7% of the vote, or 11,104 votes. Then, in 2018, Boyd ran against Menda McCall Holmes in the Republican primary election, winning 84% of the votes, 9,208 votes. He then advanced to the general election, where he beat Mark Cagle on November 6, 2018, by winning 72.9% of the votes, 17,602 votes. Boyd was elected in 2018 and is representative over District 46, which if over Cannon County and includes part of Wilson and DeKalb Counties. As listed out on Vote Smart, he is a member of many committees, as well as Chair over the Consumer and Human Resources Committee. And, in the 111th General Assembly, he sponsored 37 bills and cosponsored 59 bills.

References 

1978 births
Living people
Republican Party members of the Tennessee House of Representatives
People from Lebanon, Tennessee
East Tennessee State University alumni
United States Army reservists
Southern Baptists
21st-century American politicians